Chauhdry Abdul Rashid JP (born 7 January 1941) is a former Lord Mayor of Birmingham. He is one of three councillors representing the Bordesley ward in the heart of the city.

Background
Rashid was born in Dadyal, Jammu and Kashmir, British India (now in Azad Kashmir, Pakistan). He was educated at Ratta Middle School and left school aged thirteen in 1954. In 1955 he emigrated to the United Kingdom where he worked in the northern coastal town of Workington, Cumbria for seven and a half years.

Whilst working as a market trader he studied part-time at the Workington College of Further Education. In May 1962 he returned to Pakistan where he met and married Shafait, his wife for over 45 years.

In 1963 he began work in Birmingham in the Drawing Office at George H Hughes, a local engineering firm.

Rashid started his work in public life in 1980 when he was appointed to serve on the East Birmingham Community Health Council. This led in 1982 to his appointment to East Birmingham Health Authority where he served until 1985.

In 1982 he also became a magistrate.

He served on the Small Heath Community Law Centre during the early 1980s and also served as its Chairman.

Councillor
In May 1987, Rashid was elected to Birmingham City Council from the Small Heath ward. He won this seat only a month before sitting his final examinations for a Social Science degree from Wolverhampton University.

Whilst serving as councillor he worked in the Black Country town of Dudley as a Council Community Social Worker and Liaison Officer. During this time he also served on the Black Country Talking Newspaper, Dudley Council of Faiths and Dudley One World.

In 2000, Rashid took early retirement from local government service due to ill health. In 2002 he picked up from where he left off and has since served on the board of Birmingham Family Housing Association, the board of St Peters (Saltley) Housing Association, as governor of Mathew Boulton College and as governor of Regents Park Primary School.

He re-entered politics in 2004 and was elected as one of three councillors for the Nechells ward. His current office expires in 2022.

Lord Mayor

In May 2008, Rashid was appointed Lord Mayor of Birmingham. The following year he served, as is usual, as the Deputy Lord Mayor.

In 2009, Rashid appeared in an anti-terror television campaign funded by the UK Foreign and Commonwealth Office. He appeared in his role as Lord Mayor, alongside notable British Muslims. His life story was depicted in a documentary film produced in 2010.

References

1941 births
Living people
English people of Mirpuri descent
Pakistani emigrants to the United Kingdom
Naturalised citizens of the United Kingdom
Lord Mayors of Birmingham, West Midlands
People from Birmingham, West Midlands
People from Azad Kashmir
Alumni of the University of Wolverhampton